Diego Rafael Nicolás Arias Quero (born 8 December 1999) is a Chilean footballer who plays for Deportes La Serena.

References

1999 births
Living people
People from Angol
Chilean footballers
Chilean Primera División players
Primera B de Chile players
Deportes Temuco footballers
Deportes Santa Cruz footballers
Deportes La Serena footballers
Association football forwards